News World India was free to air 24-hour national news channel. The channel was owned by F7 Broadcast Private Limited. News World India focuses on news that touches the day-to-day life of masses. At present Rohit Saxena is chief executive officer.

F7 Broadcast Pvt. Ltd. started a channel called News World India in 2015. From September 2015, it stopped providing content to television channels and started its own television channel News World India.

About 
News World India is a national Hindi news channel from F7 Broadcast Pvt. Ltd. Earlier the channel operation was being carried out from Laxmi Studio in Film City, Noida. Currently, the channel has been shifted to Sector-4, Noida. The channel is positioned as people's channel and is unbiased on political grounds. It is different from already existing debate channels and poses itself to be research oriented. The channel is quite brand conscious in terms of bringing in advertisers.

News World India is the flagship channel of the News World India Network. The National Hindi language channel aims to cut through the chaos and offers news to the upwardly mobile Indian middle class in an interesting, engaging and interactive manner without any exaggeration or shrillness attached to it. The language is simple yet subtle.

Launched in Oct 2015, News World India has been able to carve a niche for itself with its classy, sensitive programming. A distinguishing feature of the channel is the amount of international coverage offered which is necessary for an increasingly globalised world. Besides on-the-hour news bulletins, News World India offers insightful shows helmed by experienced television personalities.

F7 Broadcast has made several Documentaries, CSR Films and Business / Corporate Films.

Collaborations

News World India & The CSR Journal 
News World India has collaborated with The CSR Journal. The CSR Journal is a digital news publication headquartered in Mumbai, India. The CSR Journal works with policymakers, not-for-profit organizations, non-governmental organizations, leading corporate houses and various stakeholders. With this collaboration, News World India has extended its reach in Central India (Madhya Pradesh) by launching a news studio at Indore.

Network Availability 
The broadcast of News World India had been discontinued in November 2019. It's not available on any platform.

Notable people 
Ajita Jain joined as an Executive Editor and relaunched the channel successfully in September 2018 as a part of her second innings. She brings with her the vast experience of broadcast journalism on national and international level along with her expertise as a highly balanced News Anchor.

See also 
 List of Hindi language television channels
 List of Television Stations in India

References 

Television channels and stations established in 2015